Stuart Tyson Smith (born 1960) is an Egyptologist and professor in the Anthropology department at the University of California, Santa Barbara. His specialty is the interaction between ancient Egypt and Nubia.

Smith is known for reconstruction of the ancient Egyptian language for the films Stargate (1994) and The Mummy (1999)

Bibliography

Nonfiction
Askut in Nubia (1995)
Wretched Kush: Ethnic Identities and Boundaries in Egypt's Nubian Empire (2003)
Valley of the Kings (2003)

Contributor
Studies in Culture Contact: Interaction, Culture Change, and Archaeology (1998)
Box Office Archaeology: Refining Hollywood's Portrayals of the Past (2007)

External links
Stuart Tyson Smith homepage

1960 births
Living people
American Egyptologists
University of California, Santa Barbara faculty